A sconce is a small protective fortification, such as an earthwork, often placed on a mound as a defensive work for artillery. It was used primarily in Northern Europe from the late Middle Ages until the 19th century. This type of fortification was common during the English Civil War, and the remains of one such structure can be seen on Fort Royal Hill in Worcester, England.

During the Eighty Years' War for Dutch independence, the sconces (schans in Dutch) were often used to defend strategic places, but were used also during sieges and in circumvallations. Several more or less intact sconces remain in the Netherlands.

The Zaanse Schans, one of the top tourist locations in the Netherlands, derived its name from its original function as a sconce. Sconces played a major part in the Serbian Revolution, countering the numerical superiority of the Turkish army.

Etymology

The etymology of sconce is from the Latin absconsus, via the French esconce: a word of many meanings, mostly signifying a covering or protection, or, by extension, that which is covered or protected. The word is closely related to the medieval Dutch schans and the German word Schanze, as used for example in the name of Hitler's military headquarters, the Wolfsschanze.

See also
 List of established military terms
 Redoubt
 Skansen

References

Fortification (architectural elements)
Fortifications by type